Chukwunonso Bassey, popularly known as Nonso Bassey, now Nonzo, is a Nigerian singer, songwriter, actor and model. He was among the top 8 finalists in the maiden edition of The Voice Nigeria and was signed to Universal Music Group Nigeria.He is also a cast member on Africa Magic TV's telenovela, Battleground. Prior to August 2022, he went by the stage name Nonso Bassey.

Early life
Bassey was born in Calabar to an Igbo father from Imo and an Efik mother from Cross River State.

In 2000, he gained admission to the University of Calabar International Secondary School, Calabar and graduated in 2006. He attended Covenant University, from where he graduated with a second class upper degree in English and Literary Studies after which he performed his National Youth Service (NYSC) as a Civil Servant in the Aviation Sector in Imo State.

Career
Bassey began his professional music career when he was featured on a song, My Dream with VJ Adams and rapper MI in 2015. In 2016 he auditioned for the first season of The Voice Nigeria, and made it to the live shows, where he finished as a top 8 finalist and was subsequently signed by Universal Music Group.

In 2017 he was cast in the role of Dr Emeka Kalu on Africa Magic's telenovela, Battleground where his on-screen chemistry with actress Ini Dima-Okojie enjoyed positive reviews from critics. In April 2017, he opened for Aṣa at her concert in Lagos. In the same year, Bassey starred in the movie Wurukum Roundabout alongside several notable African actors, including Juliet Ibrahim, Gbenro Ajibade, Susan Peters and Keppy Young.

In February 2018, Nonso Bassey released his official debut single 411, produced by Johny Drille. The song was well received and Native Magazine's reviewer, Edwin Okolo summarized his review of the single saying, "Only a handful of Nigerian musicians have created ballads so powerful that they were able to steal us away from the hypnotic thump of our incessant Afrobeat march, and with “411", Nonso Bassey seems poised to join those elite ranks."

In April 2019, Bassey released his sophomore single under Universal Music Group Nigeria, a soulful track For You produced by Yekini 'Tiwezi' Temitayo with the video directed by Adesua Okosun.

In October 2019, Bassey was nominated for the award for Best Vocal Performance (Male) for his debut single, 411 at the 13th edition of the Headies Award. He was nominated alongside Johnny Drille, Wurld, Funbi and Tay Iwar.

He changed his name from Nonso Bassey to Nonzo, following the release of his first single in 3 years "Toyo" on 12 August 2022.

Awards and nominations

Filmography 
Battleground (Telenovela) - 2017
Love Like This - 2017
From Lagos with Love - 2018
Wurukum Roundabout - 2019
Berserk - 2020
Tainted Canvas - 2020
La Femme Anjola (Feature film) - 2021
Smart Money (Series) - 2021

References

21st-century Nigerian male  singers
Covenant University alumni
Nigerian male television actors
Nigerian male pop singers
Nigerian male singer-songwriters
Nigerian soul musicians
year of birth missing (living people)
Nigerian male singers
Living people
Nigerian male models
Nigerian songwriters